"Never Be like You" is a song by Australian musician Flume, co-written and featured by Canadian artist kai. It was released on 16 January 2016, by Future Classic, as the lead single of his second studio album, Skin. The song debuted at number10 on the ARIA Singles Chart, later reaching numberone and becoming Flume's first song to top the chart. The song also charted in Belgium, France, the United States and New Zealand, where it reached numbertwo on the RMNZ Singles Chart.

In a press release, Flume said, "kai and I were sending ideas back and forth online, then met up in New York and went into the studio. We laid down some chords and started an idea but weren't feeling inspired. So we went out into the night for a few hours and when we returned, it all started to come together."

A remix by Disclosure was released on 4 March 2016 and a remix EP was released on 25 March 2016. 

At the ARIA Music Awards of 2016, the song won Best Pop Release, was nominated for Song of the Year and Best Video.

The song received a nomination for Best Dance Recording at the 2017 Grammy Awards.

On 26 January 2017, the song was voted numberone on the Triple J Hottest 100, 2016.

Critical reception
Harley Brown of Spin said that "Diplo‑endorsed artist kai provides sumptuous and sterling vocals over sparkling half‑time drops, like an instrumental B‑side from  FutureSex LoveSounds" and that "The new R&B look is a good one for Flume".

Billboard said "The song features Canadian chanteuse kai, smoothly balancing chilled out trap effects with spacey ambient noise and future bass elements, going hard and soft at oncea duality expressed in the lyrics as well, with kai begging forgiveness while asserting right to just be herself".

Rolling Stone named "Never Be like You" one of the 30 best songs of the first half of 2016: "The pop realization of the twisted techno mutations of cutting-edge acts like Flying Lotus, Rustie and Arca. "Never Be like You" skulks like Justin Timberlake's "My Love" caught in a parade of sparking, stuttering robotics."

Track listings
Digital download
"Never Be like You" – 3:54

Digital download (Disclosure remix)
"Never Be like You" (Disclosure remix) – 6:11

Digital download (EP)
"Never Be like You" – 3:54
"Never Be like You" (Disclosure remix) – 6:11
"Never Be like You" (Wave Racer remix) – 3:28
"Never Be like You" (Teengirl Fantasy remix) – 4:22

Digital download (Martin Solveig remix)
 "Never Be like You" (Martin Solveig remix) – 4:44

Charts

Weekly charts

Year-end charts

Decade-end charts

Certifications

See also
 List of best-selling singles in Australia
 List of number-one singles of 2016 (Australia)

References

2015 songs
2016 singles
Flume (musician) songs
Future bass songs
ARIA Award-winning songs
Future Classic singles
Number-one singles in Australia
Song recordings produced by Flume (musician)
Songs written by Flume (musician)